"Day Dreaming" is a song by American hip hop artist DJ Drama. The song serves as the lead single from his second studio album Gangsta Grillz: The Album (Vol. 2). The hip hop song, produced by Drumma Boy, features guest vocals from American singer Akon, as well as American rappers Snoop Dogg and T.I. The song was released onto iTunes on February 9, 2009. Originally, the song was meant for Akon's album Freedom, under the title "Go Go Dancer". The song peaked at #33 in New Zealand and #59 in Sweden, becoming DJ Drama's only entry in those countries.

Music video
The song’s music video was filmed in Los Angeles and directed by Rage. The video was released to MTV's Sucker Free on February 25, 2009. The video features cameo appearances by Lil Jon, Rich Boy, Red Cafe, Young Dro, Mac Boney, Jay Rock, Big Kuntry King, Yung L.A., Glasses Malone, Killer Mike, DeRay Davis, JR Get Money, L.A. The Darkman, B.o.B, Alfamega, Xtaci, Drumma Boy, DJ Trendsetter Sense and JabbaWockeeZ.

Charts

References

2009 singles
Grand Hustle Records singles
DJ Drama songs
Akon songs
Snoop Dogg songs
T.I. songs
Song recordings produced by Drumma Boy
Songs written by T.I.
Songs written by Akon
Songs written by Snoop Dogg
2009 songs
Songs written by Drumma Boy
Music videos directed by Dale Resteghini